Jukka-Pekka Seppo (born January 22, 1968) is a Finnish former professional ice hockey player who primarily played in the Finnish Liiga and German Deutsche Eishockey Liga (DEL). Seppo was drafted in the second round of the 1986 NHL Entry Draft by the Philadelphia Flyers, but he never played professionally in North America. He spent most of his professional career in Finland, playing ten seasons in the Liiga including six seasons with HIFK.

Career statistics

References

External links

1968 births
Living people
Essen Mosquitoes players
Finnish ice hockey centres
HIFK (ice hockey) players
HPK players
Kassel Huskies players
Sportspeople from Vaasa
Philadelphia Flyers draft picks
Tappara players
TuTo players
Vaasan Sport players
VEU Feldkirch players
VHK Vsetín players
Wipptal Broncos players
Finnish expatriate ice hockey players in the Czech Republic
Finnish expatriate ice hockey players in Germany
Finnish expatriate ice hockey players in Austria
Finnish expatriate ice hockey players in Italy